KSLD (1140 AM) is a commercial sports radio station in Soldotna, Alaska, in the United States, broadcasting  to the Kenai, Alaska, area; it is owned by KSRM Corporation.

1140 AM is a United States and Mexican clear-channel frequency.

References

External links

SLD
Radio stations established in 1983
1983 establishments in Alaska
ESPN Radio stations